Van den Boogaard is a Dutch toponymic surname meaning "from the orchard" (modern Dutch "boomgaard"). The surname has a very high number of alternative forms. People with this and closely similar names include:

Van den Boogaard
Dillianne van den Boogaard (born 1974), Dutch field hockey player
Erik-Jan van den Boogaard (born 1964), Dutch footballer
Nico H.J. van den Boogaard (1938-1982), Dutch medievalist and academic
Oscar van den Boogaard (born 1964), Dutch writer
Patrick van den Boogaard (born 1995), Dutch darts player
Theo van den Boogaard (born 1948), Dutch cartoonist
Van den Boogaart
Abraham van den Boogaart (1921–2012), Dutch-Belgian painter known as Bram Bogart
Joep van den Boogaart (1939–2017), Dutch PVDA politician
Mark van den Boogaart (born 1985), Dutch football midfielder
Van den Bogaerde
Andreas van den Bogaerde van Terbrugge (1787–1855), Dutch politician and art collector
Derek van den Bogaerde (1921–1999), English actor and writer known as Dirk Bogarde
Jasmine van den Bogaerde (born 1996), English singer and songwriter known as Birdy
Van den Bogaert
Bryan Van Den Bogaert (born 1991), Belgian football defender
Jeroen Van den Bogaert (born 1979), Belgian alpine skier
Martin van den Bogaert (1637–1694), Dutch-French sculptor known as Martin Desjardins
Van den Boogerd / Van den Boogert
Dominic van den Boogerd (born 1959), Dutch art critic and art historian
Maurits van den Boogert (born 1972), Dutch writer on Ottoman history

See also
Bogaard
Bogaert
Boogaard
Boogaerts

References

Dutch-language surnames
Dutch toponymic surnames
Surnames of Dutch origin